The Queens Community Board 2 is a local advisory group in New York City, encompassing the neighborhoods of Hunters Point, Long Island City, Sunnyside, and Woodside, in the borough of Queens. It is delimited by the East River on the west; Bridge Plaza North, the Long Island Rail Road and Northern Boulevard on the north; New York Connecting Railroad on the east; and Newtown Creek on the south.

Its current chairperson is Lisa Deller; the District manager is Debra Markell-Kleinert. Board meetings are held on the first Thursday of the month, and cabinet meetings are held on the fourth Wednesday.

Demographics 
As of the United States Census, 2000, the Community Board had a population of 109,920, up from 94,845 in 1990 and 88,930 in 1980. 

Of these (as of 2000), 33,877 (30.8%) were non-Hispanic White, 2,158 (2.0%) were African-American, 29,380 (26.7%) were Asian or Pacific Islander, 184 (0.2%) were American Indian or Native Alaskan, 550 (0.5%) were of some other race, 3,732 (3.4%) were non-Hispanic of two or more races, and 40,039 (36.4%) were of Hispanic origins.

Geography 

References 

 https://web.archive.org/web/20140517043120/http://cb2queens.org/

External links 
Profile of the Community Board

Community boards of Queens